Green Hope High School is a secondary school located at 2500 Carpenter Upchurch Road in Cary, North Carolina. It is a part of the Wake County Public School System.

History

Green Hope School origins
The school is named for the historic Green Hope School, built in 1927. This rural school included grades 1 through 12. In 1952, it was renamed Green Hope Elementary School when the higher grades were reallocated to nearby Cary or Apex High Schools.

On August 15, 1963, at 1 AM, the old school caught fire and was completely destroyed. The scoreboard from the old Green Hope School is still present in the modern-day Green Hope High School main gym.

Green Hope High School today

Today's Green Hope High School opened in 1999. The present campus is about a mile away, across the road from the old building site.  It retained the name of the former school after lobbying by alumni.

It first opened for freshmen and sophomore students from neighboring overcrowded schools. It added a grade level for the two subsequent years and graduated its first senior class in 2002.

The school consists of a main three-story building, with additional modular classrooms adjacent. The Cary Tennis Park, operated by the town of Cary, which functions as the school's tennis practice facility, is located directly behind the school. Green Hope Elementary School and Park are located directly across the street from the Tennis Park.  Both schools are operated by Wake County Public School System.

Jim Hedrick became principal of Green Hope circa 2005, and served there until 2014, when he became principal of Athens Drive High School. The Green Hope school community paid tribute to him after he died on August 2, 2016.

Karen Summers became principal in 2014. In 2017 she became the principal of Green Level High School. Dr. Diann Kearny served as interim principal for the remainder of the school year. The current principal, Camille Hedrick, is retiring on August 1, 2022. The new principal, Alison Cleveland, will take over for the 2022–23 school year.

Student demographics 
As of the 2021–2022 school year, Green Hope had 2,247 students, with 51% of the students are male and 49% are female. Of those students, 50.3% are White, 33.8% Asian, 6.2% Hispanic, 6.0% Black, 3.4% two or more races, 0.2% Native Hawaiian/Pacific Islander, and 0.1% Native American. The total minority enrollment is 50%.

6% of the students are economically disadvantaged, with 5% being eligible for free lunches and 1% eligible for the reduced-price lunch program.

98% of Green Hope High School students graduate and receive a high school diploma.

Faculty 
As of the 2021–2022 school year, Green Hope had 115.75 full-time equivalent teachers, for a student-to-teacher ratio of 19.41:1.

Academics

Curriculum 
The school includes grades 9 through 12. Green Hope offers 27 Advanced Placement® courses. 76% of the students take AP® courses, with 68% passing one or more exams. 82% of the student take the SAT test, with an average score of 1257.

GreatSchools gave Green Hope its College Success Award—Gold in 2019, 2020, 2021, and 2022 "for its track record in helping students enroll and succeed in college." 78% of graduates pursue either college or vocational training.

Rankings 
U.S. News & World Report ranks Green Hope as #1 in Wake County, #19 public high school in North Carolina, and #633 in the United States. Niche scores the school at an A+ with a rank of #4 amongst public and private high schools in North Carolina.

The school posted the fifth-highest average SAT score in the Raleigh Durham area: 1699 with 94.7% of students taking the test.

Academic honors 
Students with specific grade point averages can join the Beta Club, Quill and Scroll, and the National Honor Society. There are also the Math Honor Society, Tri-M Music Honor Society, the National Art Honor Society, the National English Honor Society, the National Psychology Honor Society, the National Social Studies Honor Society, National Technical Honor Society, Science National Honor Society, and the Spanish Honor Society for students who demonstrate excellence in corresponding areas of study to join.

Student life

Clubs and organizations 
Green Hope has academic competitive teams such as the Chemistry Olympiad, Model United Nations, the Science Bowl, and the Science Olympiad. The Green Hope High School band program includes a concert band, a jazz ensemble, the marching band, the percussion ensemble, the symphonic band, the wind ensemble, the winter guard, and the winter indoor percussion ensemble. The orchestra program includes a chamber orchestra, a concert orchestra, and a symphony orchestra. Other student organizations include chorus, DECA, drama club, Future Business Leaders of America, student council, and more.

Publications 
The student yearbook is named The Talon. The school's online newspaper is called The Green Hope Falcon.

#WhyGHWalks 
On February 28, 2018, two weeks after the Stoneman Douglas High School shooting, about 2000 students walked out of school to show solidarity with the victims of the tragedy.

Athletics

Mascot and colors 
The mascot is the Green Hope Fighting Falcon. The school's colors are maroon and green—the same as that of the predecessor institution.

Sports teams 
Green Hope competes under the North Carolina High School Athletic Association and the Southwest Wake Athletic Conference with a 4A classification.

The school has the following co-ed sports teams: varsity cheerleading, junior varsity cheerleading, cross country, indoor track, swimming, and track. Sport teams for women include varsity basketball, junior varsity basketball, golf, gymnastics, lacrosse, junior varsity lacrosse, varsity soccer, junior varsity soccer, varsity softball, junior varsity softball, stunt, tennis, varsity volleyball, and junior varsity volleyball. Men's sport teams include varsity baseball, junior varsity baseball, basketball, junior varsity basketball, varsity football, junior varsity football, golf, lacrosse, junior varsity lacrosse, varsity soccer, junior varsity soccer, varsity tennis, and wrestling.

Non-NCHSAA/Independent and club sports include bowling, dance team, men's ultimate frisbee (sanctioned by USA Ultimate), and women's ultimate frisbee (sanctioned by USA Ultimate).

Cross Country
Green Hope's cross country team was featured in a 2008 USA Today article for having more than 200 members. Green Hope won six straight women's cross country NCHSSA 4A Championships from 2009 to 2014, and the men's team won two state championships in 2010 and 2017.

Soccer
Both the men's and women's soccer programs are perennial state contenders. At the end of the 2012 season, the men's team was ranked #1 in the nation, winning both state and national championship honors. The 2013 Women's state championship team was also ranked #1 in the country.

Stephen Bickford was voted the Adidas/USA Today national player of the year in 2004, in addition to winning the state player of the year title.

State championships 
Green Hope's won the Wells Fargo Cup State Championship (formerly Wachovia Cup) from the NCHSAA for having "the best overall interscholastic athletic performance within each of the state’s four competitive classifications" in 2009–10, 2010–11, 2011–12, 2012–2013, 2013–14, 2014–15, 2015–2016, and 2017–2018. Other state championships include:

 4A Men's Swimming and Diving: 2013, 2014, 2018, 2019, 2020, 2021, 2022
 4A Women's Swimming and Diving: 2020
 4A Men's Tennis: 2019
 4A Women's Tennis: 2017, 2018, 2019
 4A Women's Volleyball: 2016, 2017, 2018
 4A Cheerleading: 2006, 2018, 2019
 4A Men's Outdoor Track: 2018
 4A Men's Indoor Track: 2016, 2018
 4A Men's Soccer: 2011, 2012, 2016, 2018
 Gymnastics: 2012, 2013, 2014, 2018 
 4A Men's Cross Country: 2010, 2017
 4A Women's Golf: 2014
 4A Women's Cross Country: 2009, 2010, 2011, 2012, 2013, 2014
 4A Women's Soccer: 2013
 4A Women's Lacrosse: 2005, 2006, 2012 
 4A Men's Golf: 2003, 2006, 2007, 2009, 2010

Notable alumni 
 Jordyn Adams, professional baseball player
 Casey Cole, Franciscan friar, Roman Catholic priest, author, and YouTuber
 Héctor Cotto, Olympic track hurdler, represented Puerto Rico at the 2012 Summer Olympics
 Chris Flemmings, professional basketball player
 Max Povse, MLB pitcher
 Brendon Todd, professional golfer on PGA Tour
 Curtis Waters, recording artist

References

External links

Buildings and structures in Cary, North Carolina
Public high schools in North Carolina
Wake County Public School System
Schools in Wake County, North Carolina